Alexis Omar Méndez (born 23 October 1969) is a retired male professional track and road racing cyclist from Venezuela. He twice competed for his native country at the Summer Olympics: 1988 and 2000.

Major results

1986
 Central American and Caribbean Games
3rd  Points race
3rd  Team pursuit
1989
 1st Overall Tour de Guadeloupe
1990
 3rd Overall Vuelta al Táchira
 3rd Overall Tour de Guadeloupe
1991
 3rd Road race, National Road Championships
1993
 2nd Overall Tour de Guadeloupe
 3rd Road race, National Road Championships
1994
 1st  Overall Vuelta al Táchira
 1st  Overall Vuelta al Estado Zulia
1996
 1st  Overall Clásico Virgen de la Consolación de Táriba
1998
 2nd  Individual pursuit, Central American and Caribbean Games
 3rd Road race, National Road Championships
 9th Overall Vuelta al Táchira
1st Stage 10
1999
 3rd Road race, National Road Championships
2000
 1st  Overall Vuelta a la Independencia Nacional
1st Stages 4b & 7b
 2nd Time trial, National Road Championships
2001
 1st Stage 10 Vuelta al Táchira
 1st Stage 4 Vuelta a Venezuela

References

External links
 
Venezuelan cyclists

1969 births
Living people
Venezuelan male cyclists
Vuelta a Venezuela stage winners
Tour de Guadeloupe winners
Cyclists at the 1988 Summer Olympics
Cyclists at the 2000 Summer Olympics
Cyclists at the 1999 Pan American Games
Olympic cyclists of Venezuela
People from Táchira
Pan American Games competitors for Venezuela
20th-century Venezuelan people
21st-century Venezuelan people